Kim Jung-soo (born 17 January 1975) is a retired South Korean association footballer. He currently assistant coach of South Korea U23.

Club career 
He was a founding player of Daejeon Citizen in 1997.

Managerial career 
He was a head coach of South Korea U17 in 2019 FIFA U-17 World Cup.

References

External links 
 

1977 births
Living people
Sportspeople from Daegu
South Korean footballers
Association football defenders
South Korean football managers
Daejeon Hana Citizen FC players
Jeju United FC players
K League 1 players